Bartlesville Air Force Station (ADC ID: P-77) is a closed United States Air Force General Surveillance Radar station. It was closed in 1961.

History
In late 1951 Air Defense Command selected Bartlesville, OK as a site for one of twenty-eight radar stations built as part of the second segment of the permanent radar surveillance network. Prompted by the start of the Korean War, on July 11, 1950, the Secretary of the Air Force asked the Secretary of Defense for approval to expedite construction of the second segment of the permanent network. Receiving the Defense Secretary's approval on July 21, the Air Force directed the Corps of Engineers to proceed with construction.

On 1 May 1951 the 796th Aircraft Control and Warning Squadron began operating a pair of AN/FPS-10 radars, and initially the station functioned as a Ground-Control Intercept (GCI) and warning station.  As a GCI station, the squadron's role was to guide interceptor aircraft toward unidentified intruders picked up on the unit's radar scopes.   In 1958 an AN/FPS-6 replaced the AN/FPS-10 height-finder radar.

In addition to the main facility, Bartlesville operated two AN/FPS-14 Gap Filler site:
 Ottawa, OK        (P-77A) 
 Winfield, OK      (P-77D) 

This site was inactivated 1 June 1961 due to budgetary constraints.  Today what was Bartlesville Air Force Station is largely obliterated.  It now consists of various residential and commercial establishments.

Air Force units and assignments

Units
 Constituted as the 796th Aircraft Control and Warning Squadron
 Activated on 1 May 1951
 Discontinued and inactivated on 1 June 1961

Assignments
 546th Aircraft Control and Warning Group, 1 May 1951
 159th Aircraft Control and Warning Group, 4 June 1951
 33d Air Division, 6 February 1952
 20th Air Division, 1 March 1956
 Kansas City Air Defense Sector, 1 January 1960 – 1 June 1961

See also
 List of United States Air Force aircraft control and warning squadrons
 United States general surveillance radar stations

References

 
 
 Information for Bartlesville AFS, OK

Installations of the United States Air Force in Oklahoma
Radar stations of the United States Air Force
Aerospace Defense Command military installations
1951 establishments in Oklahoma
1961 disestablishments in Oklahoma
Military installations established in 1951
Military installations closed in 1961